Trazpiroben (developmental code name TAK-906) is a dopamine antagonist drug which was under development for the treatment of gastroparesis. It acts as a peripherally selective dopamine D2 and D3 receptor antagonist. The drug has been found to strongly increase prolactin levels in humans, similarly to other peripherally selective D2 receptor antagonists like domperidone. Clinical development of trazpiroben was discontinued before April 2022. Trazpiroben was originated by Altos Therapeutics and was under development by Takeda Oncology.

References

External links
 Trazpiroben - AdisInsight

Abandoned drugs
D2 antagonists
D3 antagonists
Motility stimulants
Peripherally selective drugs
Prolactin releasers
Benzoic acids
Spiro compounds
Cyclohexanes
Imidazolidinones
Piperidines